Giuseppe Addobbati (31 December 1909 – 4 January 1986) was an Italian film actor known for his roles in Spaghetti Western and action films in the 1960s and 1970s. He was often billed as John MacDouglas for films released to an American audience.

Addobbati was born in Makarska and later lived in Trieste. He made over 80 film appearances between 1937 and 1980 often as a police officer or law enforcer. He starred in films such as The Phantom of the Opera (1964), Blood For A Silver Dollar  alongside Giuliano Gemma (Montgomery Wood) and in The Conformist (1970).

He also made several horror film appearances such as Nightmare Castle in 1965 alongside Barbara Steele, Paul Muller, Helga Liné, Laurence Clift and Rik Battaglia

Selected filmography 

 Condottieri (1937, regia di Luis Trenker) as Giovannis Vater
 Queen of the Scala (1937, regia di Camillo Mastrocinque e Guido Salvini) as Guido Vernieri
 Marcella (1937, regia di Guido Brignone)
 Giuseppe Verdi (1938, regia di Carmine Gallone)
 La mia canzone al vento (1939, regia di Guido Brignone)
 13 uomini e un cannone (1939, regia di Giovacchino Forzano) as Uomo #9
 Le educande di Saint-Cyr (1939, regia di Gennaro Righelli) as Un caddetto
 Sei bambine e il Perseo (1940, regia di Giovacchino Forzano) as Lattanzio Gorini
 Piccolo alpino (1940, regia di Oreste Biancoli) as L'aiuntante di campo di Lupo
 The King of England Will Not Pay (1941, regia di Giovacchino Forzano) as Tommaso Buondelmonti
 Violette nei capelli (1942, regia di Carlo Ludovico Bragaglia) as Il direttore d'orchestra
 Alfa Tau! (1942, regia di Francesco De Robertis)
 Fedora (1942, regia di Camillo Mastrocinque)
 Giorno di nozze (1942, regia di Raffaello Matarazzo) as L'architetto (uncredited)
 The White Angel (1943, regia di Giulio Antamoro) as Il marchesino Arnaldo
 Incontri di notte (1943, regia di Nunzio Malasomma)
 Tutta la città canta (1945, regia di Riccardo Freda) as Il direttore
 La casa senza tempo (1945, regia di Andrea Forzano) as Il medico della clinica psichiatrica
 Imbarco a mezzanotte (1952, regia di Joseph Losey)
 Melodie immortali (1952, regia di Giacomo Gentilomo) as Uomo al opera
 Redenzione (1952, regia di Piero Caserini)
 Il mostro dell'isola (1954, regia di Roberto Bianchi Montero) as Direttore 'Sirena'
 The Country of the Campanelli (1954, regia di Jean Boyer) as Guardiamarina Tom
 Cento serenate (1954, regia di Anton Giulio Majano) (as John Douglas)
 La romana (1954, regia di Luigi Zampa)
 Ripudiata (1954, regia di Giorgio Walter Chili) (as John Douglas)
 Il padrone sono me (1955, regia di Franco Brusati)
 Il cigno (1956, regia di Charles Vidor) as Footman (uncredited)
 Guerra e pace (1956, regia di King Vidor) as House Servant (uncredited)
 Thundering Jets (1958, regia di Helmut Dantine) as Kurt Weber (as John Douglas)
 La Dolce Vita (1960, regia di Federico Fellini) (uncredited)
 Costantino il Grande (1960, regia di Lionello De Felice)
 Solimano il conquistatore (1961, regia di Vatroslav Mimica) (as John McDouglas)
 Ultimatum alla vita (1962, regia di Renato Polselli) as Berri (as John McDouglas)
 Marte, dio della guerra (1962, regia di Marcello Baldi)
 Tharus figlio di Attila (1962, regia di Roberto Bianchi Montero) as Kimg Bolem (as John McDouglas)
 Maciste contro lo sceicco (1962, regia di Domenico Paolella) as Duke of Malaga
 Venere imperiale (1962, regia di Jean Delannoy)
 Zorro e i tre moschettieri (1963, regia di Luigi Capuano)
 I tre implacabili (1963, regia di Joaquín Luis Romero Marchent) as Bardon (as John McDouglas)
 The Beast of Babylon Against the Son of Hercules (1963, regia di Siro Marcellini) as Licardio
 Il mostro dell'opera (1964, regia di Renato Polselli) as Stefano (as John McDouglas)
 Le tre spade di Zorro (1963, regia di Ricardo Blasco) as Marques de Santa Ana (as John McDouglas)
 Ursus nella terra di fuoco (1963, regia di Giorgio Simonelli) as Magistrate
 Maciste contro i Mongoli (1963, regia di Domenico Paolella) as The King (as John MacDouglas)
 Son of the Circus (1963, regia di Sergio Grieco)
 Giacobbe, l'uomo che lottò con Dio (1963, regia di Marcello Baldi) as Adamo - Adam (as John Douglas)
 Maciste, gladiatore di Sparta (1964, regia di Mario Caiano) as Marcellus
 Maciste nelle miniere di re Salomone (1964, regia di Piero Regnoli) as Namar
 Messalina vs. the Son of Hercules (1964, regia di Umberto Lenzi) as Lucilius (as John McDouglas)
 Il mostro dell'opera (1964, regia di Renato Polselli) as Stefano (as John McDouglas)
 Cavalca e uccidi (1964, regia di José Luis Borau) as Judge Stauffer (as John Mac Douglas)
 I pirati della Malesia (1964, regia di Umberto Lenzi) as Muda Hassin
 Una spada per l'impero (1964, regia di Sergio Grieco) as Pertinacius
 Il ranch degli spietati (1965, regia di Roberto Bianchi Montero) as Ken Hogg (as John McDouglas)
 La sfida degli implacabili (1965, regia di Ignacio F. Iquino) as Doctor (as John MacDouglas)
 Un dollaro bucato (1965, regia di Giorgio Ferroni) as Donaldson (as John MacDouglas)
 Amanti d'oltretomba (1965, regia di Mario Caiano) as Jonathan, the Butler (as John McDouglas)
 Colorado Charlie (1965, regia di Roberto Mauri) as Hogan, Sheriff of Little River (as John Mc Douglas)
 Degueyo (1966, regia di Giuseppe Vari) as Col. Clark (as John MacDouglas)
 Operazione paura (1966, regia di Mario Bava) as Innkeeper
 Tempo di massacro (1966, regia di Lucio Fulci) as Mr. Scott (as John M. Douglas)
 Congiura di spie (1967, regia di Edouard Molinaro) as Moranez
 L'ultimo killer (1967, regia di Giuseppe Vari) as Il padre di Ramón (as John McDouglas)
 Un uomo, un cavallo, una pistola (1967, regia di Luigi Vanzi) as Mr. Stanley
 Con lui cavalca la morte (1967, regia di Giuseppe Vari) as Geremia (as John Mc Douglas)
 Arabella (1967, regia di Mauro Bolognini)
 Un killer per sua maestà (1968, regia di Federico Chentrens) as Conte
 Un buco in fronte (1968, regia di Giuseppe Vari) as Prior (as Jhon Mac.Douglas)
 The Battle of El Alamein (1969, regia di Giorgio Ferroni) as Gen. Georg Stumme
 L'urlo dei giganti (1969, regia di León Klimovsky) as Gen. Moore (as John Douglas)
 Dio perdoni la mia pistola (1969, regia di Mario Gariazzo) as Sheriff Brennan
 Una sull'altra (1969, regia di Lucio Fulci) as Brent (as John Douglas)
 Colpo rovente (1970, regia di Piero Zuffi) (as John McDouglas)
 Il conformista (1970, regia di Bernardo Bertolucci) as Padre di Marcello
 Hranjenik (1970, regia di Vatroslav Mimica) as Profesor
 Appuntamento col disonore (1970, regia di Adriano Bolzoni) as Pappyanakis
 Ricatto di un commissario di polizia a un giovane indiziato di reato (1971, regia di Edouard Molinaro) as Le maire (uncredited)
 Desert of Fire (1971, regia di Renzo Merusi) as Jean
 Blaise Pascal (1972, TV Movie, regia di Roberto Rossellini) as Étienne Pascal
 Baciamo le mani (1973, regia di Vittorio Schiraldi) as Nicola D'Amico
 L'età di Cosimo de Medici (1973, TV Mini-Series, regia di Roberto Rossellini)
 I Kiss the Hand (1973, regia di Vittorio Schiraldi) as Nicola D'Amico
 Mussolini ultimo atto (1974, regia di Carlo Lizzani) as Raffaele Cadorna
 Il portiere di notte (1974, regia di Liliana Cavani) as Stumm
 Assassinio al sole (1974, regia di Philippe Labro) as Docteur Morgan (as Giuseppe Addobati)
 L'ossessa (1974, regia di Mario Gariazzo) as Doctor
 Il gatto dagli occhi di giada (1977, regia di Antonio Bido) as Judge
 Corse a perdicuore (1980, regia di Mario Garriba) (final film role)

External links 
 

1909 births
1986 deaths
Austro-Hungarian people
Italian male film actors
Male Spaghetti Western actors
20th-century Italian male actors
People from Makarska
Dalmatian Italians